Sri Lanka competed at the 2000 Summer Paralympics in Sydney, Australia. 3 competitors from Sri Lanka won no medals to finish joint 69th in the medal table along with all other countries who failed to win medals.

See also 
 Sri Lanka at the Paralympics
 Sri Lanka at the 2000 Summer Olympics

References 

Sri Lanka at the Paralympics
2000 in Sri Lankan sport
Nations at the 2000 Summer Paralympics